The 2021 Berlin ePrix (formally the 2021 BMW i Berlin E-Prix presented by CBMM Niobium) was a pair of Formula E electric car races held at the Tempelhof Airport Street Circuit at Tempelhof Airport in the outskirts of Berlin on 14 and 15 August 2021. They were the fourteenth and fifteenth rounds of the 2020–21 championship, marking the series' season finale for the second consecutive year. This was the seventh iteration of the Berlin ePrix, the only event to have featured in all Formula E seasons. Similarly to 2020, race one was run on the traditional track layout, with a reversal thereof being used in race two. This however meant that the event was not a conventional double-header, instead both races were treated separately in official documents.

The first race was won by Lucas di Grassi, with Edoardo Mortara and Mitch Evans rounding out the podium. Norman Nato took his maiden Formula E victory in the second race, finishing ahead of Oliver Rowland and Stoffel Vandoorne. The event saw Nyck de Vries and his Mercedes-EQ Formula E Team crowned first ever Formula E world champions.

Classification

Round 14

Qualifying

Notes:
  – Sam Bird received a 3-place grid penalty for causing a collision in the previous race in London.

Race

Notes:
  – Pole position; fastest in group stage.
  – Fastest lap.

Round 15

Qualifying

Race

Notes:
  – Pole position; fastest in group stage.
  – Fastest lap.

Notes

References

|- style="text-align:center"
|width="35%"|Previous race:2021 London ePrix
|width="30%"|FIA Formula E World Championship2020–21 season
|width="35%"|Next race:2022 Diriyah ePrix
|- style="text-align:center"
|width="35%"|Previous race:2020 Berlin ePrix
|width="30%"|Berlin ePrix
|width="35%"|Next race:2022 Berlin ePrix
|- style="text-align:center"

2021
2020–21 Formula E season
2021 in German motorsport
August 2021 sports events in Germany